Edward J. Roethe (May 12, 1878 – May 1, 1952) was an American politician and newspaper editor.

Early life 
Roethe was born in Whitewater, Wisconsin.

Career 
Roethe began his career as a teacher. He later worked as the publisher of the Fennimore Times in Fennimore, Wisconsin. He served as president of the village of Fennimore in 1919 and after the community was incorporated as a city he served as the first mayor of Fennimore from 1919 to 1924. He served in the Wisconsin Senate as a Republican twice, initially as successor to his brother Henry Edgar Roethe.

Personal life 
Roethe died after suffering a stroke while working in his garden.

References

1878 births
People from Whitewater, Wisconsin
People from Fennimore, Wisconsin
Editors of Wisconsin newspapers
Mayors of places in Wisconsin
Republican Party Wisconsin state senators
1952 deaths